Linothele is a genus of South American curtain web spiders that was first described by Ferdinand Karsch in 1879.

The venom of Linothele sp has a median lethal dose of 0.6 mg / kg, two toxins, both of low molecular weight, were isolated in the venom, Ls1 and Ls2. These two toxins have been shown to be quite lethal to white mice by injection into the cerebroventricular region. The lethal dose of Ls1 and Ls2 is 24 and 19 μg / kg respectively, both toxins represent 0.21% and 0.43% of the weight of the whole venom.

Species
 it contains 22 species:
Linothele cavicola Goloboff, 1994 – Ecuador
Linothele cristata (Mello-Leitão, 1945) – Brazil
Linothele curvitarsis Karsch, 1879 (type) – Venezuela
Linothele fallax (Mello-Leitão, 1926) – Bolivia, Brazil
Linothele gaujoni (Simon, 1889) – Ecuador
Linothele jelskii (F. O. Pickard-Cambridge, 1896) – Peru
Linothele longicauda (Ausserer, 1871) – Ecuador
Linothele macrothelifera Strand, 1908 – Colombia
Linothele melloleitaoi (Brignoli, 1983) – Colombia
Linothele monticolens (Chamberlin, 1916) – Peru
Linothele mubii (Nicoletta, Ochoa, Chaparro & Ferretti, 2022) – Peru
Linothele paulistana (Mello-Leitão, 1924) – Brazil
Linothele pukachumpi Dupérré & Tapia, 2015 – Ecuador
Linothele quori Dupérré & Tapia, 2015 – Ecuador
Linothele septentrionalis Drolshagen & Bäckstam, 2021 – Bahamas
Linothele sericata (Karsch, 1879) – Colombia
Linothele sexfasciata (Schiapelli & Gerschman, 1945) – Venezuela
Linothele spinosa Drolshagen & Bäckstam, 2021 – Peru
Linothele tsachilas Dupérré & Tapia, 2015 – Ecuador
Linothele uniformis Drolshagen & Bäckstam, 2021 – Peru
Linothele yanachanka Dupérré & Tapia, 2015 – Ecuador
Linothele zaia Dupérré & Tapia, 2015 – Ecuador

References

Dipluridae
Mygalomorphae genera
Taxa named by Ferdinand Karsch